Korça fashiste ('Fascist Korçë') was short-lived Albanian language (Tosk) newspaper published from Korçë in 1939. The newspaper was founded on July 1, 1939, replacing Gazeta e Korçës ('Korçë Gazette') of Zhan Gorguzi. Zhan Gorguzi served as the director of Korça fashiste. On 9 July 1939 the newspaper was replaced by Liktori.

References

1939 establishments in Albania
1939 disestablishments in Albania
Albanian-language newspapers
Defunct newspapers published in Albania
Fascist newspapers and magazines
Mass media in Korçë
Newspapers established in 1939
Publications disestablished in 1939